Thiogranum is an obligately chemolithoautotrophic genus of bacteria from the family of Ectothiorhodospiraceae with one known species (Thiogranum longum).  Thiogranum longum has been isolated from a rock from a deep-sea hydrothermal field from the coast of Suiyo Seamount in Japan.

References

Chromatiales
Bacteria genera
Monotypic bacteria genera
Taxa described in 2015